Rhabdotorrhinus is a genus of birds in the hornbill family, Bucerotidae.

Species

References 
 Gordon Lindsay Maclean - Robert's Birds of South Africa, 6th Edition Remarkably, no Rhabdotorrhinus species occur in Afrika

 
Bird genera
 
Taxa named by Adolf Bernhard Meyer
Taxa named by Lionel William Wiglesworth